The Mausoleum of Theodoric is an ancient monument just outside Ravenna, Italy. It was built in 520 AD by Theodoric the Great, king of the Ostrogoths, as his future tomb.

Description
The mausoleum's roof consists of a single carved stone  in diameter weighing 230 tonnes. A niche leads down to a room that was probably a chapel for funeral liturgies; an external stair leads to the upper floor. Located in the centre of the upper floor is a fragmentary ancient Roman porphyry tub, likely from a bath complex, in which Theodoric was buried. His remains were removed during Byzantine rule, when the mausoleum was turned into a Christian oratory. In the late 19th century, silting from a nearby rivulet that had partly submerged the mausoleum was drained and excavated.

Recognition
It was inscribed with seven other "Early Christian Monuments and Mosaics of Ravenna" buildings as one of the UNESCO World Heritage Sites in 1996. According to the ICOMOS evaluation, "the significance of the mausoleum lies in its Gothic style and decoration, which owe nothing to Roman or Byzantine art, although it makes use of the Roman stone construction technique of opus quadratum, which had been abandoned four centuries before" and in the fact that "it is the only surviving example of a tomb of a king of this period."

See also

 Ostrogothic Ravenna
 Palace of Theodoric now lost, also in Ravenna
 Sparlösa Runestone
 Haus Potsdam
 History of medieval Arabic and Western European domes

References

Further reading
Weitzmann, Kurt, ed., Age of spirituality: late antique and early Christian art, third to seventh century, no. 109, 1979, Metropolitan Museum of Art, New York, ; full text available online from The Metropolitan Museum of Art Libraries

External links
 Ravenna Turismo Timetable and information for visiting the mausoleum and other Ravenna monuments, in Italian, English and German.
No copyright notice has been found on the site so far. Please remove the text and the photo if you find one.
 Revolving image of the upper floor. The dark color tub appears at the lower corner.
 Download a free paper model of Theoderic's Mausoleum (www.papermodel.cz)

Theoderic
Monuments and memorials in Italy
Palaeo-Christian architecture in Ravenna
Buildings and structures completed in the 6th century
Rotundas in Europe
Tourist attractions in Emilia-Romagna
Ostrogothic art
Theoderic the Great